Mikis Mandakas (June 13, 1952 – February 28, 1975) was a Greek nationalist student who was murdered by far-left activists in Italy during the Years of Lead.

Biography

Mikis Mandakas was born in Athens, Greece. He was the son of army officer Nikos Mandakas and mother Kalliopi Mandakas. During the dictatorship he was studying in Italy, first in Bologna and later in Rome, for dissertation on medicine studies. There he joined the youth of Italian right party the Italian Social Movement (MSI), FUAN.

The Murder

On February 24, 1975 in the city of Rome, the trial of three leftists accused for burning the house of Mario Mattei, the secretary of the local organization of the right party MSI, began. On 16 April 1973, his home was set ablaze and his two children, Stefano and Virgilio (8 and 22 years respectively), were burnt alive after the arson attack.
Police in riot gear surrounded the courthouse and began removing hundreds of protestors due to the high number of leftist demonstrators. Eventually the protests become violent, with individuals throwing bricks, stones and Molotov cocktails. The fights continued over the next two days, and
on the fourth day of the trial a protest rally where the MSI condemned the inaction of the government towards the incidents occurred.
 
At around 9:30 AM, Achille Lollo appears in the historic center of the city with two carabinieri, which ultimately causes more violence and uproar outside the court. Further conflicts arose between neo-fascist and communist demonstrators, resulting in one demonstrator receiving bullet wounds to their calf and a journalist being wounded by a brick. Michalis and other members of the MSI are present with Lollo during the trial. At noon the court interrupts the meeting, at which point the fascists organize to leave.

At 13:15 a large group of leftists gathered outside the offices of MSI and attempt to storm the building and the corridor behind the main entrance. Michallis, Lollo and the few still present in the building decide to attempt an escape through the side door, but are quickly spotted as they attempt to flee. At this point the leftists open fire and a bullet pierces the skull of Mikis Mantakas wedging itself inside the right temple. 

Mantakas loses consciousness, but was still alive as his partners carried him back into the office and waited for aid. He is later transferred to Spiritus Santos hospital, were he undergoes several blood transfusions. The Doctor in charge of Mantakas' surgery stated: "The projectile entered the left area of the parietal bone and crossed the entire skull..". Mantakas would not survive the ordeal. At approximately 18:30, after two hours of surgery, Mikis Mantakis' heart stops beating and he is pronounced dead.

As a result of the fighting, 22 people were wounded by gunfire.

Reactions

The killer was Alvaro Lojacono, member of the Italian Communists and later the Red Brigades. Lojacono was sentenced to 16 years jail time in 1981, however he is yet to serve any of the time on his sentence. 

Political unrest in Italy followed the murder of Mandakas, resulting in the creation of an armed branch Nuclei Armati Rivoluzionari (NAR) of former members of the MSI. The NAR would eventually incite an attack on 28 February 1978 which resulted in the assassination of a man and three of his comrades. The attackers claimed responsibility for the attack, stating that the attack was in memory of Mikis Mandakas at the three year anniversary of his murder.

See also 
 2013 Neo Irakleio Golden Dawn office shooting
 Acca Larentia killings
 
 Primavalle fire

References

External links
  Ελληνικός Κόσμος
  Ελληνικές Γραμμές
  Mikis Mantakas-Risposta a Interrogazione

People from Athens
Greek murder victims
Greek nationalists
Italian neo-fascists
Terrorism in Italy
1952 births
1975 deaths
Communist terrorism
Greek people murdered abroad
Assassinated activists
Murdered students
Deaths related to the Years of Lead (Italy)
1975 murders in Italy